G. K. Pillai may refer to:

Gopal Krishna Pillai (born 1949), Indian Administrative Service (I.A.S) officer and the former Home Secretary of India
G. K. Pillai (actor) (born 1924), Indian actor in Malayalam films hails from Thiruvananthapuram
Kollam G. K. Pillai (1934–2016), Indian actor in Malayalam films hails from Kollam